The Day the Fish Came Out (Greece: Otan ta psaria vgikan sti steria) is a 1967 DeLuxe Color Greek–British comedy film directed and written by Michael Cacoyannis who also designed the film's futuristic costumes. The film stars Tom Courtenay, Colin Blakely and Sam Wanamaker.

Plot
The film, set in 1972, was inspired by an actual incident which occurred on 17 January 1966: a B-52G Stratofortress collided with a KC-135 Stratotanker over Palomares, Spain, and four B-28 FI 1.45-megaton-range hydrogen bombs aboard the B-52 were briefly lost.  In a title sequence shot by Maurice Binder, a chorus of Spanish Flamenco dancers explains why the film's location is Greece rather than Spain.

Life on the remote Greek resort island of Karos is forever changed when atomic bombs are dropped there by a NATO plane rapidly losing power.  Life on the island is so bleak that the inhabitants stage a mass exodus on news that Denmark has opened Greenland to Greek emigration.  The pilots drop their payload – which includes two atomic weapons and a mysterious box called simply "Container Q" – over land, because they are under orders not to drop at sea.  The hapless pilots parachute out and land safely on the island, but with no equipment or means to contact their headquarters, and they are left wearing only their underwear.  Lacking resources – money to buy clothes, food, or even to pay for a long-distance call to base – the pilot and navigator of the lost bomber scour the island like vagabonds.  Unknown to the pilots, the Americans have already deployed their own operation: a team of agents disguised as resort developers.  The pilots are unaware of the fact that American agents are also on the island searching for their cargo.

The island suddenly fills with clamoring, hedonistic tourists who believe the developer is going to build the best resort in the area first.  Meanwhile, a poor goatherd and his wife find Container Q and, presuming it holds some treasure, they try to open it.  Unsuccessful at first – because Container Q is virtually impregnable – the goatherd eventually steals a device that sprays acid that will eat through anything.  Expecting gold, he and his wife instead find strange-looking rocks.  The Americans are eventually led back to the panicked pair, but not before they throw Container Q into the sea, and the rocks into a cistern which provides the island's water.  The contents of Container Q – presumably highly toxic – thus begins to contaminate all the water being consumed on the island.

By nightfall, as tourists revel, the waters surrounding Karos become dotted with the bodies of dead and dying fish.  The Americans sent to recover the lost payload of the stricken jet realize that they are too late.  The pilot and the navigator, having begged enough small change from the tourists to call home, are shocked to be booted from the long-distance phone in the post office by the American developers.  Too late, the pilots realize that the developers are American operatives.  The revelers continue dancing wildly as a voice from a PA system pleads in vain for their attention, presumably to warn them of their imminent demise.

Cast

 Tom Courtenay as The Navigator
 Colin Blakely as The Pilot
 Sam Wanamaker as Mr. James Elias
 Candice Bergen as Electra Brown
 Ian Ogilvy as Peter
 Dimitris Nikolaidis as The Dentist
 Nicolas Alexios as Goatherd
 Patricia Burke as Mrs. Mavroyannis
 Paris Alexander as Fred
 Arthur Mitchell as Frank
 Marlena Carrer as Goatherd's Wife
 Tom Klunis as Mr. French
 William Berger as Man in Bed
 Kostas Papakonstantinou as Manolios
 Dora Stratou as Travel Agent
 Alexander Lykourezos as Director of Tourism
 Tom Whitehead as Mike
 Walter Granecki as Base Commander
 Dimitris Ioakeimidis as Policeman
 James Connolly as Tourist
 Assi Dayan as Tourist
 Robert Killian as Tourist
 Derek Kulai as Tourist
 Keith Lancaster as Tourist
 Alexis Mann as Tourist
 Raymond McWilliams as Tourist
 Michael Radford as Tourist
 Peter Robinson as Tourist
 Grigoris Stefanides as Tourist
 Peter Stratful as Tourist
 Kosta Timvios as Tourist
 Herbert Zeichner as Tourist

Production
The film was written and directed by Michael Cacoyannis, who had enjoyed a big success with Zorba the Greek. Finance was provided by 20th Century Fox who described it as "a satirical contemporary comedy with serious overtones". The original cast announced in June 1966 was Tom Courtney, James Fox, Colin Blakely and Elena Nathaniel. (Fox would ultimately drop out.)

Cacoyannis was reportedly keeping the script secret and only showing the actors their parts. In July Candice Bergen joined the cast, in her third film. Bergen said the director cast her because he wanted an "arrogant type".

Filming started 6 August 1966 in Greece. Bergen said filming was "heaven – the most fun I've had in ages."

Franc Roddam was an extra in the film.

Reception
The film was not a critical or commercial success.

Time magazine's October 13, 1967, review called it a "1,000,000-mega-ton [sic] bomb" and suggested, "It may ... be the homosexiest movie since Modesty Blaise," referring in part to its stars Courtenay and Blakeley as "spend[ing] the rest of the film in their Jockey shorts playing peekaboo with the villagers" and describing other male characters' costuming as "the cunningest white booties, fishnet T shirts, lavender and puce shorts." The New York Times of October 3, 1967, agreed that the film contained superficially gay overtones, describing some of the film's characters as a "small group of conspicuously swishy young men" and the film as "conspicuously and even offensively campy." Among its other negative descriptions, the Times panned the film as "a fantastic dud," and "a totally amateurish effort ... shockingly pointless and unamusing."

According to Fox records, the film needed to earn $1,350,000 in rentals to break even and made $1,590,000, meaning it made a loss.

References

External links
 
 
 
 
 

1967 films
1967 comedy films
English-language Greek films
British comedy films
British satirical films
20th Century Fox films
Films set in Greece
Films set in the future
Films set in the Mediterranean Sea
Films about nuclear war and weapons
Films directed by Michael Cacoyannis
Films scored by Mikis Theodorakis
Greek satirical films
Greek comedy films
1960s English-language films
1960s British films